Eckelshausen is a village in the vicinity of Biedenkopf in Germany. It is part of the municipality Biedenkopf.

Marburg-Biedenkopf